David South (also known as "David Del Sur") is an American musician and filmmaker. He is a co-founder of Mono Prism and currently plays bass guitar in SISU, NYC punk band Flowers of Evil, and the solo project of A Place to Bury Strangers bassist Dion Lunadon.

In the past, South has been a member of The Valley Arena, and has performed with Young Boys, Haunted Hearts, and Crocodiles.

His motion work continues to expand, but includes music videos for Gardens & Villa and SISU.

South created Mono Prism in 2012 as a springboard for people involved in music, film, and print projects. He lives and works in NYC's Lower East Side.

Discography 
 "Vile Existence" (1997, with Vile Existence - vocals. bass)
 "Sesso Vita" (2007, with The Valley Arena - bass)
 "Flowers of Evil" (2015, with Flowers of Evil - bass) 
 "City of Fear" (2015, with Flowers of Evil - bass)

Videography
 "Maximize" short documentary (2015)
Flowers of Evil "SS Eyes" music video (2015)
 Flowers of Evil "Throw Fists Not Fits" music video (2015)
SISU "Two Thousand Hands" music video (2013)
Gardens & Villa "Space Time" music video (2012)

References

External links
Mono Prism
Instagram

Living people
American bass guitarists
Year of birth missing (living people)
Place of birth missing (living people)